The Dance (French: La gamberge) is a 1962 French comedy film directed by  Norbert Carbonnaux and starring  Jean-Pierre Cassel, Françoise Dorléac and Arletty.

The film is based on the French comic strip .

Cast

References

Bibliography 
 Quinlan, David. Quinlan's Film Stars. Batsford, 2000.

External links 
 

1962 comedy films
French comedy films
1962 films
1960s French-language films
Films directed by Norbert Carbonnaux
Films based on French comics
Live-action films based on comics
Films based on comic strips
1960s French films